Michele Mario Alberto Riccardini (October 2, 1910 – July 24, 1978) was an Italian film actor. He appeared in around fifty films during his career as well as several television episodes. In 1943 he played the role of Don Remigio in Luchino Visconti's Ossessione.

Partial filmography

 Like the Leaves (1935) - Il Bronzino
 Come le foglie (1938) - Bernabei
 Retroscena (1939) - (uncredited)
 Dora Nelson (1939) - Sor Mario
 Manon Lescaut (1940)
 The Sinner (1940) - Un amico di Paolo e di Piero (uncredited)
 Idyll in Budapest (1941)
 La compagnia della teppa (1941) - Rossini
 Pia de' Tolomei (1941) - Baldo
 Se non son matti non li vogliamo (1941) - Un altro membro dei "Matti"
 L'amore canta (1941) - (uncredited)
 Giarabub (1942) - Il cuoco
 Street of the Five Moons (1942) - Michele
 Violette nei capelli (1942) - Il tirchio amico di Giuliano
 La fabbrica dell'imprevisto (1942) - Il regista
 I due Foscari (1942) - L'ubriaco nella taverna
 The Champion (1943) - Federico
 Ossessione (1943) - Don Remigio
 The Ways of Sin (1946) - Il sacerdote
 The Great Dawn (1947) - Don Terenzio
 Tragic Hunt (1947) - Il maresciallo
 Lost Youth (1948) - Sor Giuseppe (uncredited)
 Mad About Opera (1948) - L'altro amico scrocone di Scala
 D'homme à hommes (1948)
 The Walls of Malapaga (1949) - Le patron du restaurant / Il padrone dell'osteria (uncredited)
 Una voce nel tuo cuore (1949) - Enrico
 No Peace Under the Olive Tree (1950) - Il maresciallo
 Il sentiero dell'odio (1950)
 Double Cross (1951) - Signor Biagni
 Les miracles n'ont lieu qu'une fois (1951) - (uncredited)
 Viva il cinema! (1952)
 Rome 11:00 (1952)
 The Blind Woman of Sorrento (1953) - Un congiurato
 Carmen proibita (1953)
 Cavallina storna (1953) - Il sig. Francesco
 Gran Varietà (1954) - il banchiere Teresky (episodio 'Fregoli')
 Theodora, Slave Empress (1954) - Il carceriere (uncredited)
 Ulysses (1954) - Leodes
 An American in Rome (1954) - Cameriere del ristorante (uncredited)
 La tua donna (1954)
 The Miller's Beautiful Wife (1955) - Avvocato
 Vacanze a Ischia (1957) - Avvocato Lojacono
 Le bellissime gambe di Sabrina (1958) - Ragioniere
 L'inferno addosso (1959)
 Adua and Her Friends (1960) - The Yielding Customer in the Trattoria (uncredited)
 Crimen (1960) - Luciano (uncredited)
 Ghosts of Rome (1961) - Antonio - sarto e portiere
 The Joy of Living (1961) - Greengrocer

References

External links

Bibliography
 Bacon, Henry. Visconti: Explorations of Beauty and Decay. Cambridge University Press, 1998.

1910 births
1978 deaths
Italian male television actors
Italian male film actors
People from Perugia
20th-century Italian male actors